Aleksandr Nikolayevich Rytchkov (born 29 September 1974) is a Russian former professional footballer.

He played for Standard Liège, RC Lens, 1. FC Köln, FC Basel, SR Delémont, SC Paderborn 07 and AC Bellinzona. He was fired by RC Lens for a positive cannabis test in 1996.

Rytchkov joined Basel's first team for their 1998–99 season under head coach Guy Mathez. After playing in five test games, Rytchkov played his domestic league debut for his new club in the home game in the St. Jakob Stadium on 18 July 1998 as Basel played a goalless draw against Sion. He scored his first goal for the club on 25 July in the home game against Zürich, it was the first goal of the match as Basel won 2–1. He suffered an injury during a test match after the winter break in February 1999 of that season, that kept him out of the game until May that year. 

In the following season Rytchkov moved on to SR Delémont. During his time with Basel Rytchkov played a total of 36 games for the club, scoring a total of seven goals. 25 of these games were in the Nationalliga A and 11 were friendly games. He scored five goals in the domestic league and the other two were scored during the test games.

References

Sources
 Rotblau: Jahrbuch Saison 2017/2018. Publisher: FC Basel Marketing AG. 
 Die ersten 125 Jahre. Publisher: Josef Zindel im Friedrich Reinhardt Verlag, Basel. 
 Verein "Basler Fussballarchiv" Homepage

External links
 
 

Living people
1974 births
People from Usolye-Sibirskoye
Association football midfielders
Soviet footballers
Russian footballers
Russia youth international footballers
Russia under-21 international footballers
Russian expatriate footballers
Expatriate footballers in Belgium
Expatriate footballers in France
Expatriate footballers in Germany
Expatriate footballers in Switzerland
Russian expatriate sportspeople in Belgium
Russian expatriate sportspeople in France
Russian expatriate sportspeople in Germany
Russian expatriate sportspeople in Switzerland
FC Lokomotiv Moscow players
Standard Liège players
RC Lens players
Ligue 1 players
1. FC Köln players
Bundesliga players
FC Basel players
SC Paderborn 07 players
AC Bellinzona players
SR Delémont players
Russian Premier League players
Russian sportspeople in doping cases
Doping cases in association football
Sportspeople from Irkutsk Oblast